Rhytidopilidae is an extinct family of fossil sea snails, marine gastropod mollusks from the Paleozoic Era.

This family is unassigned to superfamily. This family has no subfamilies.

References